Vanquish in Vengeance is the eighth studio album by the American death metal band Incantation. The album was released on November 27, 2012.

Track listing

Personnel
John McEntee - guitars, vocals
Alex Bouks - guitar
Kyle Severn - drums
Chuck Sherwood - bass

Production and miscellaneous staff
Bill Korecky & Incantation - production
Dan Swanö - mixing, mastering
Bill Korecky - recording, engineering
Kristoff Bates - photography
Will Kuberski - cover art
Matt Vickerstaff - layout, design
Josh Eldridge - management
John Litchko - guitar engineering
Lance Walter - engineering

References

Incantation (band) albums
2012 albums
Listenable Records albums